The Transport Medal was a British campaign medal sanctioned on 8 November 1903 and awarded by the Lord Commissioners of the Admiralty. It was awarded to masters and officers of merchant ships employed by the Transport Service to move troops to either South Africa during the South African War or to China during the Boxer Rebellion. The officers of hospital ships also qualified.

It was intended that the medal would be awarded for any future campaign where a medal was issued to the troops taking part, but it was not awarded again after the South Africa and China wars.

The medal,  in diameter, is silver and has a plain straight swivel suspender.

Clasps
 S.AFRICA 1899–1902
 For services related to the South African War, 13 September 1899 – 31 October 1902.
 CHINA 1900
 For services related to the Boxer Rebellion, 1 June 1900 – 31 December 1901.

The officers of 117 transports and eleven hospital ships qualified, with a total of 1,719 medals awarded: 1,219 with the 'S. Africa 1899-1902' clasp, 322 with the 'China 1900' clasp and 178 with both clasps.

See also
 Mercantile Marine Medal

Notes and references

British campaign medals